Johner is a surname. Notable people with the surname include:

 Johner, Swiss Rapper
 Brad Johner, country music singer
 Dustin Johner (born 1983), Canadian ice hockey player
 Hans Johner, Swiss chess master
Mélody Johner (born 1984), Swiss equestrian
 Nancy Montanez Johner, incumbent Under Secretary for Food, Nutrition, and Consumer Services within the United States Department of Agriculture
 Paul Johner, Swiss chess master
 The Johner Brothers, Canadian country music duo from Saskatchewan

German-language surnames